The Flugplatzrennen (known alternately as either 3rd Flugplatzrennen or 5th Flugplatzrennen) was a motor race, run for cars complying with Formula One rules, held on 17 September 1961 at Zeltweg Airfield, Austria. The race was run over 80 laps of the circuit, and was dominated by British driver Innes Ireland in a Lotus 21.

Ireland took both pole position and the fastest lap, and finished a lap ahead of the rest of the field. He led all but the first two laps, after Jim Clark took the lead at the start.

Lorenzo Bandini did not start the race after he suffered engine problems in practice, but shared his team-mate Renato Pirocchi's car in the race.

Qualifying

Results

Porsche System Engineering entered a second car, given #3, but withdrew the entry.

References
 "The Grand Prix Who's Who", Steve Small, 1995.
 "The Formula One Record Book", John Thompson, 1974.
 Race results at www.silhouet.com

Flugplatzrennen